Karl Theodor von Piloty (1 October 1826 – 21 July 1886) was a German painter, noted for his historical subjects, and recognised as the foremost representative of the realistic school in Germany.

Life and work
Piloty was born in Munich. His father, Ferdinand Piloty (d. 1844), enjoyed a great reputation as a lithographer. In 1840, Karl was admitted as a student of the Munich Academy, under the artists Karl Schorn and Julius Schnorr von Karolsfeld.  A year later the acclaimed history paintings (referred to as the 'Belgian paintings'), i.e. the Compromise of the nobles and The Abdication of Charles V by the two Belgian artists Edouard de Bièfve and Louis Gallait, were shown in Munich and their realistic depiction of a historic subject matter made a lasting impression on him.  After a journey to Belgium, France and England, Piloty commenced work as a painter of genre pictures, and in 1853 produced a work, Die Amme (The Wet Nurse), which, on account of its originality of style, caused a considerable sensation in Germany at the time.

But he soon forsook this branch of painting in favour of historical subjects, and produced in 1854 for King Maximilian II The Accession of Maximilian I to the Catholic League in 1609. It was succeeded by Seni at the Dead Body of Wallenstein (1855), which gained for the young painter the membership of the Munich Academy, where he succeeded Schorn (his brother-in-law) as professor in 1856.

Among other well-known works by Piloty are the Battle of the White Mountain near Prague, Nero Dancing upon the Ruins of Rome (1861), Godfrey of Bouillon on a Pilgrimage to the Holy Land (1861), Galileo in Prison (1864) and The Death of Alexander the Great (unfinished), his last great work. He also executed a number of mural paintings for the royal palace in Munich.

For Baron von Schach, Piloty painted the famous Discovery of America. In 1874, he was appointed keeper of the Munich Academy, being afterwards ennobled by the king of Bavaria. Piloty was the foremost representative of the realistic school in Germany. He was a successful teacher, and among his more famous pupils were Hans Makart, Franz von Lenbach, Franz Defregger, Gabriel von Max, Georgios Jakobides, and Eduard von Grützner.

Gallery

Notes

References

External links

1826 births
1886 deaths
Artists from Munich
19th-century German painters
19th-century German male artists
German male painters
Academic staff of the Academy of Fine Arts, Munich
19th-century painters of historical subjects